Fouad Chouki (born 15 October 1978 in Strasbourg) is a French middle distance runner who specializes in the 1500 metres.

He won a bronze medal at the 2001 Mediterranean Games in Tunis and finished fourth at the 2002 European Championships in Munich. He then reached the final at the 2003 World Championships in Paris, but was disqualified as he tested positive for erythropoietin. The IAAF handed him a suspension from September 2003 to September 2005. Chouki's claims the substance was injected into his body by an unknown individual led the French Athletics Federation to cut his ban by six months. However, the claim was rejected by the Court of Arbitration for Sport.

His personal best time is 3:30.83 minutes, achieved in August 2003 in Zürich.

See also
List of sportspeople sanctioned for doping offences

References

External links

1978 births
Living people
French male middle-distance runners
Doping cases in athletics
French sportspeople in doping cases
Sportspeople from Strasbourg
French sportspeople of Moroccan descent
Mediterranean Games bronze medalists for France
Mediterranean Games medalists in athletics
Athletes (track and field) at the 2001 Mediterranean Games
20th-century French people
21st-century French people